Murtazali Muslimov is an Azerbaijani freestyle wrestler. In 2018, he won one of the bronze medals in the 70 kg event at the 2018 European Wrestling Championships held in Kaspiysk, Russia.

In 2017, he won the silver medal in the 70 kg event at the 2017 Islamic Solidarity Games held in Baku, Azerbaijan.

A sample collected from the athlete on 12 July 2019, during the Yasar Dogu, has revealed the presence of the prohibited substances drostanolone metabolite and oxandrolone metabolites. The athlete was suspended for a period of ineligibility of 4 years from 12 July 2019 until 11 July 2023.

Major results

References

External links 
 

Living people
Year of birth missing (living people)
Place of birth missing (living people)
Azerbaijani male sport wrestlers
European Wrestling Championships medalists
Doping cases in wrestling
Azerbaijani sportspeople in doping cases
Islamic Solidarity Games medalists in wrestling
Islamic Solidarity Games competitors for Azerbaijan
21st-century Azerbaijani people